The Mendocino Woodlands State Park is a group camping facility located at 39350 Little Lake Road, Mendocino County, California,  inland from the town of Mendocino. It was built as a Recreational Demonstration Area by the Civilian Conservation Corps. To the south, the park abuts the Big River State Park. It was declared a National Historic Landmark on September 25, 1997.

History
Mendocino Woodlands was one of forty-six campgrounds (including Camp David) created by the Works Progress Administration and the Civilian Conservation Corps in the 1930s. Its rustic wood-and-stone buildings, built by the WPA are surrounded by second-growth redwood forest. Like the other campgrounds, Mendocino Woodlands was originally planned as a site for youth summer camps in which the participants would be introduced to the wonders of nature. However, Mendocino Woodlands is the only one of the campgrounds that has been continuously used for public camping.

In 1997, the Mendocino Woodlands Recreation Demonstration Area was designated as a National Historic Landmark.

Management
The Mendocino Woodlands State Park is managed by Mendocino Woodlands Camp Association, a nonprofit corporation that has operated and maintained the facilities at the park since 1949.

See also
 Lark Camp

References

External links

 California State Parks official web page for Mendocino Woodlands
 Mendocino Woodlands Camp Association
 Wildernet: Mendocino Woodlands State Park
 Mendocino Woodlands Recreation Demonstration Area, National Historic Landmarks official page

State parks of California
Parks in Mendocino County, California
National Historic Landmarks in California
Civilian Conservation Corps in California
Works Progress Administration in California
Protected areas established in 1934
Parks on the National Register of Historic Places in California
National Register of Historic Places in Mendocino County, California
National Park Service rustic in California